Michael Anthony Deering (born November 25, 1967), known by his stage name Mikey D, is an American rapper. He is best known for being a lead member of the groups Mikey D & The L.A. Posse and Main Source. As a member of Main Source, he replaced Large Professor, who parted ways with the group due to business differences. In 1994, he appeared on Main Source's second album, Fuck What You Think, as the lead MC.

Early life and education 
Mikey D was born on November 25, 1967, in Laurelton, Queens, New York City, New York. Born to Linda Deering and Victor Fisher. His parents were separated when he was young and was raised by his grandparents, Jerome and Betty Deering in Laurelton Queens, New York. He attended PS 37 in Queens. He then attended JHS 231 in Queens.

He attended Springfield Gardens High School.

Career 
Mikey first started rapping at a young age at his junior high school, after hearing music by the Cold Crush Brothers and Clientele Brothers, which inspired him to become an MC. He was the youngest member to join the Clientele Brothers, a group of emcees consisting of Eddie O'Jay and Will Seville He would be writing rhymes and freestyling in parks and areas around his neighborhood, getting training help by O'Jay and Seville, trying to develop his skills and rhymes flows in his adolescence.

While in high school, he met future emcee/actor LL Cool J. Although, him and Mikey didn't go to the same school together. They went to their own separate schools. James went to Andrew Jackson High School. They would come over to each of their own schools they were attending and freestyling rhymes with each other. He was known as J-Ski, but Mikey would suggest a new name for his moniker. He would give him a stage name "Ladies Love", but didn't want it in his stage name. He shortened it to just "LL", put it next to the word "Cool" and added "J", which stood for his first name, James.

In 1985, Mikey and his group called the Symbolic Three, got signed to Reality Records. Around that year, he and his friend Johnnie Quest met inspiring upcoming producer named Paul "Paul C" McKasty, through Cliente Brothers members Eddie O'Jay and Will Seville.

He formed a group with the late Paul C and childhood friend DJ Johnnie Quest. According to Deering, he stated that his group originally wanted to be called "Boom Bash", but one of his managers didn't think it was a good idea. The group was called Mikey D & the L.A. Posse. They were signed to Public Records. They had a single which was released in 1987, song called "My Telephone", along with tracks like "Dawn" and "Bust a Rhyme". He followed up with two other singles "I Get Rough" & "Go For It" in the same year.

In 1988, Mikey D was the winner of the New Music Seminar Battle for World Supremacy where he battled Melle Mel.

While recording an album with his group, he learned that Paul C was murdered in his sleep at his home. There were disputes between another group who were also named the L.A. Posse, a group from Los Angeles and Sleeping Bag Records, a label that Mikey was signed to. Sleeping Bag Records was forced to drop the group's name after being sued for name duplication and Mikey  took a three-year break from the music business after the death of producer Paul "Paul C" McKasty. While spending time in Miami, Florida, his manager was Mike Beasley at the time. He had a cousin who own a studio in Manhattan, New York City, New York. He would try to find a label that was gonna give Mikey a record deal but he caught the attention of R&B singer Jeff Redd who heard his freestyling raps. He told him there was a group that needed a lead rapper for the group Main Source. He contacted them and freestyled raps to the group and liked what they heard.

In 1993, he become an official member of the critically acclaimed Toronto/Queens-based hip hop group Main Source after Large Professor left to pursue a solo career. He appeared on Fuck What You Think on Wild Pitch Records in 1994. They released a single called "What You Need", which did well in Billboard's Hot Rap Singles, only peaking at #48.

He is featured on a song called "Pump Ya Fist Like This" on Large Professor's 2008's third album, Main Source.

In 2020, Mikey released a distribution company called Pass the Torch, where he is the founder and currently operates his own company.

Mikey currently hosts his own show on YouTube called The Real Mikey D History (His-story), a documentary series released in 2021.

Discography

Albums 
with Main Source
 Fuck What You Think (1994, Wild Pitch Records)

as Mikey D and the LA Posse
 Better Late Than Never: In Memory of Paul C (2006, MicSic)

Solo albums
 Day of D'Struction (2016, Elements of Hip-Hop)

Collaboration albums
 Dramacide  (with DJ Trouble Lee) (2019, 16F)

Extended plays
 Calm Before the Storm (with Elements of Hip-Hop) (2013)
 From the Heart (with J-Soul) (2014)

Guest appearances 
2005: "The Perfect Storm" (Cee-Rock "The Fury" album Bringin' Da' Yowzah!!!)
2008: "Pump Ya Fist Like This" (Large Professor album Main Source)
2013: "Sweet 16s" (Neek the Exotic album Hustle Don't Stop)
2013: "The Amazing" (Red Venom album Red House)
2013: "The Operation" (DJ Shark album Oxidized Silver)
2015: "Mikey Destruction, Devastating Tito & DJ Slice" (Canibus & Bronze Nazareth album Time Flys, Life Dies...Phoenix Rise)
2019: "The Spark" (Taiyamo Denku album The Book of Cyphaden - Chapter One)
2021: "Nyghtlife" (The Good People album The Greater Good)

References

External links 
 
 
 Mikey D's Distribution Company

1967 births
Living people
People from Queens, New York
African-American male rappers
Musicians from New York (state)
East Coast hip hop musicians
21st-century American rappers
21st-century American male musicians
21st-century African-American musicians
20th-century African-American people